Zinaida Mykhaylivna Turchyna (née Stolitenko on 17 May 1946) is a retired Ukrainian handball player. Coached by her husband Igor Turchin she competed for the Soviet Union in all major international tournaments in 1973–1988, except for the boycotted 1984 Summer Olympics, and won three Olympic and five world championship medals. In 2000 a panel from the International Handball Federation and sports journalists named her the best female handball player of the 20th century.

Stolitenko was brought to handball in 1959 by Igor Turchin, a team-sports coach 10 years her senior, who later headed HC Spartak Kyiv in 1962–1993 and the Soviet handball team in 1973–1993. She married him in 1965 and changed her last name from Stolitenko to Turchyna. They had a daughter Natalia (born 1971) and a son Mikhail (born 1983). Natalia played handball alongside her mother for Spartak Kyiv, while Mikhail went into basketball. After the death of her husband in 1993 Turchyna took over his coaching positions at Spartak Kyiv and the Ukrainian national team. She retired from coaching in 1996, but still works as the manager of Spartak Kyiv. Since 2002 she lives with her boyfriend Vladimir.

References

1946 births
Living people
Sportspeople from Kyiv
Soviet female handball players
Ukrainian female handball players
Handball players at the 1976 Summer Olympics
Handball players at the 1980 Summer Olympics
Handball players at the 1988 Summer Olympics
Olympic handball players of the Soviet Union
Olympic gold medalists for the Soviet Union
Olympic bronze medalists for the Soviet Union
Olympic medalists in handball
Medalists at the 1988 Summer Olympics
Medalists at the 1980 Summer Olympics
Medalists at the 1976 Summer Olympics